Great! TV (stylized as GREAT! tv) is a general entertainment channel in the United Kingdom owned by Narrative Entertainment UK Limited. It originally launched as Sony Entertainment Television on 7 April 2011. However, it was closed on 6 February 2018 and replaced by Sony Crime Channel. It was brought back for a second time on 10 September 2019 when it replaced True Entertainment. The relaunched Sony Channel had different idents and programming than the former due to inheriting some programming from its predecessor True Entertainment and on 25 May 2021, following Narrative Capital's acquisition of Sony's channels, it was rebranded as Great! TV.

History
BT agreed a deal with Sony Pictures Television to offer its programming on-demand on BT Vision from 1 March 2010. The move marked Sony's debut in the UK market, over a year ahead of the launch of the Sony Entertainment Television channel. Sony Entertainment Television also appeared on TalkTalk TV during the YouView platform launch in 2012, but was later removed.

Sony Pictures Television acquired channel 157 on Sky's EPG, previously owned by Film 24, in November 2010. A one-hour timeshift channel was also available from launch after the purchase of Open Access 3's Sky EPG slot on channel 190. Both Film 24 and Open Access 3 closed on 4 April 2011, to make way for previews of Sony Entertainment Television. On 15 December 2011, Sony Entertainment Television was added to Virgin Media. On 2 April 2012, Sony Entertainment Television +1 moved to Current TV's former Sky EPG slot on channel 183, with channel 190 used to launch Men&Movies +1. On 3 July 2012, Sony Entertainment Television +1 moved to channel 181.

The channel was rebranded as Sony Channel on 12 January 2016, but closed on 6 February 2018 to be replaced by Sony Crime Channel on Sky and Virgin Media. The last programme on the channel was an episode of Saving Hope.

On 24 July 2019, it was announced that Sony Channel would be relaunched and would replace its predecessor True Entertainment from 10 September 2019. The channel replaced True Entertainment on all platforms (Freeview 48, Sky 157, Freesat 142, Virgin 189), with the last programme shown on True Entertainment being an episode of Highway to Heaven.

Due to Narrative Capital acquiring SPT's full UK portfolio on 14 May 2021, the 4 Sony-branded free-to-air channels in the UK adopted the Great! branding on 25 May 2021. As a result, the channel was rebranded as Great! TV.

Logos

Programming

Original
The original Sony Channel was aimed at women aged between 25 and 54 and broadcast a range of dramas and comedies, including Hawthorne, Huff, and 'Til Death. Sony Entertainment Television also brought UK series Hustle and Hotel Babylon, along with the last season of Las Vegas and reruns of Crossing Jordan, Dawson's Creek, My Boys, Ned and Stacey, and NewsRadio. It also showed movies from SET's parent company Sony Pictures Entertainment, such as The Da Vinci Code, All the King's Men, Marie Antoinette, and Philadelphia. From September 2011, Holby City began airing on Sony Entertainment Television.

On 16 May 2012, Sony Entertainment Television began showing BBC Spy drama Spooks from series 1. It was announced on 2 August 2012, that Sony Entertainment Television acquired the rights to broadcast Hot in Cleveland in the UK and Ireland, and it showed season 3 on 14 September 2012, season 1 and season 2 had already been broadcast on Sky Living. The channel also broadcast the American sitcom Community, ITV's Secret Diary of a Call Girl and the BBC's highly successful Ashes to Ashes and Life on Mars. The channel started to broadcast the UK TV premieres of various other programmes including The Night Shift, Saving Hope, Younger, Satisfaction and Orange Is the New Black. Paranormal content on the former channel included Ghost Hunters, Ghost Hunters International and Celebrity Ghost Stories. In 2017, the channel began to broadcast repeats of America's Got Talent.

Relaunch
The relaunched Sony Channel (which later became Great! TV) retained some programming from its predecessor channel, True Entertainment, but added more Sony-owned programmes to the schedule.

Current 
 Castle
 Classic Who Wants to Be a Millionaire? (Also on Challenge)
 Charlie's Angels
 Crazy Like a Fox
 Due South
 Hart to Hart
 Body of Proof
 Highway to Heaven
 M*A*S*H
 Murder, She Wrote
 The New Avengers
 The Persuaders!
 Randall and Hopkirk (Deceased) 
 Starsky & Hutch
 Sue Thomas: F.B. Eye
 T.J. Hooker
 Touched by an Angel
 Diagnosis: Murder

Former 
 Born and Bred
 Chicago Hope
 Days Of Our Lives
 Happy Days
 Little House on the Prairie
 Rumpole of the Bailey
 The Vice
 The Waltons

References

External links

English-language television stations in the United Kingdom
Sony Pictures Television
Sony Entertainment Television
Television channels in the United Kingdom
Television channels and stations established in 2011
Television channels and stations disestablished in 2018
Television channels and stations established in 2019
2011 establishments in the United Kingdom
2018 disestablishments in the United Kingdom
2019 establishments in the United Kingdom